The Etawah gharana is a North Indian school of sitar and surbahar music and named after a small town close to Agra where Imdad Khan (1848–1920) lived. It is also known as Imdadkhani gharana in the honour of its founder, Imdad Khan.

Imdad Khan family
Imdad Khan family is one of the most renowned musical families from India. With its roots in Etawah on the outskirts of Agra before finally branching out to Calcutta with Enayat Khan and Hyderabad, Indore and Mumbai with Wahid Khan and Vilayat Khan.

The gharana's achievements include the development of the Surbahar, major structural changes to both the sitar and surbahar and the creation and development of the instrumental style known as the gayaki ang (vocal style performed on sitar) by Vilayat Khan and this style of sitar is now known as the Vilayatkhani sitar.

Living performers of the family include Shahid Parvez, Shujaat Khan, Nishat Khan, Irshad Khan, Wajahat Khan, Hidayat Khan and Zila Khan who is the first female performer of this gharana.

Exponents of the gharana
Imdad Khan
 Enayat Khan
 Wahid Khan
 Vilayat Khan
 Imrat Khan
 Rais Khan
 Shahid Parvez Khan
 Budhaditya Mukherjee 
 Shujaat Khan
 Nishat Khan
 Irshad Khan
 Wajahat Khan
 Shafaat Khan
 Bimalendu Mukherjee
 Anupama Bhagwat
 Arvind Parikh
 Sameep Kulkarni
 Rajeev Janardan
 Ashim Chowdhury
 Ramprapanna Bhattacharya
 Sayan Ghosh
 Soumya Biswajit

References

External links
Imdadkhani or Etawah gharana of Sitar - videoclip on YouTube

 
Sitars
Sitar players
Etawah
Music schools in India